Jacoby Creek Charter School District is located in Bayside, a small community, near Arcata, California, United States. The district oversees public education through grade 8 in a portion of west central Humboldt County, California.

The school it operates is the Jacoby Creek School in Bayside. The school has installed a 30,000 watt solar power array.

School board and staff
The school board consists of five members:
Brenna Goodman 
Chris Sunderson
Tuan Luu
Shari Lovett
John Renteria

As of October 2017, the superintendent is Tim Parisi and the principal is Melanie Nannizzi.

Awards 
 2017 US Department of Education National Blue Ribbon School

References

External links
 

School districts in Humboldt County, California
Bayside, California